Netball Australia is the main governing body for netball in Australia. It is affiliated to World Netball.  It is responsible for organising and administrating  the Australia national netball team, Suncorp Super Netball and the Australian National Netball Championships. It previously organised and administrated the Australian Netball League, the ANZ Championship, the Commonwealth Bank Trophy league and the Esso/Mobil Superleague.

Netball Australia was originally founded in 1927 as the All Australia Women's Basket Ball Association. In 1970, after "women's basket ball" became known as netball, the organisation changed its name to the All Australia Netball Association. It adopted its current name in 1993.

History
Netball Australia was founded on 26/27 August 1927 as the All Australia Women's Basket Ball Association during an interstate women's basketball carnival. Its founding members included the Sydney City Girls' Amateur Sports Association (New South Wales), the Australian Ladies Basket Ball Association (Queensland), the South Australian Women's Basket Ball Association (South Australia), the Melbourne Girls Basket Ball Association (Victoria) and the Basket Ball Association of Perth (Western Australia). Tasmania began competing in national tournaments in 1933. The Australian Capital Territory and Northern Territory joined in 1975 and 1977 respectively. In 1970, after "women's basket ball" became known as netball, the organisation changed its name to the All Australia Netball Association. It adopted its current name in 1993.

Amid a funding crisis where Netball Australia lost 7 million over two COVID-impacted years, in 2022 the organisation announced that it had secured Hancock Prospecting as high performance program partner from 2022 to 2025, with an investment of 15 million over four years. Netball Australia announced that Hancock would invest directly in the Diamonds’ athletes and coaches, and provide funding support for training camps and competitions. The Diamonds team was photographed in uniform bearing the Hancock Prospecting logo. It was later revealed that some players did not support Hancock Prospecting as a sponsor due to historical comments made by the company's founder, Lang Hancock on indigenous issues and the company's record on environmental issues. The controversy led to the resignation of Netball Australia Chair, Marina Go, citing personal reasons; and the Diamonds refused to wear the sports uniform with Hancock Prospecting logo. Within a month of announcing the sponsorship deal, Hancock Prospecting withdrew their offer, saying it did not wish to add to netball's “disunity problems”. Hancock offered Netball Australia short-term funding until such time as a more permanent arrangement could be secured.

Competitions

Current

Former

Australian Netball Awards
Netball Australia hosts the annual the Australian Netball Awards. Current and recent awards include:

 Liz Ellis Diamond
 Australian International Player of the Year
 Australian Netball Hall of Fame
 Joyce Brown Coach of the Year
 Suncorp Super Netball Team of the Year
 Suncorp Super Netball Player of the Year Award
 Suncorp Super Netball Young Star Award

Former awards include:
 Australian ANZ Championship Coach of the Year
 Australian ANZ Championship Player of the Year

Member organisations
 Netball Australian Capital Territory
 Netball New South Wales
 Netball Northern Territory
 Netball Queensland 
 Netball South Australia
 Netball Tasmania
 Netball Victoria
 Netball Western Australia

Board

Presidents

Chief Executive Officers

Notable directors

Notable people
 

Nadine Cohen, Deputy CEO

References

External links
 Official site

 
Sports governing bodies in Australia
Australia
Australia
Australia
Non-profit organisations based in Australia
Sports organizations established in 1927
1927 establishments in Australia